is a passenger railway station in the city of Ōta, Gunma, Japan, operated by the private railway operator Tōbu Railway. It is numbered "TI-51".

Lines

Station layout
The station consists of a single island platform connected to the station building by a footbridge.

Platforms

Adjacent stations

History
Sammaibashi Station opened on March 19, 1913. A new station building was completed in 2009.

From March 17, 2012, station numbering was introduced on all Tōbu lines, with Sammaibashi Station becoming "TI-51".

Passenger statistics
In fiscal 2019, the station was used by an average of 750 passengers daily (boarding passengers only).

Surrounding area
 Gunma Komodo-no-kuni
 Ōta-Karaseyama Post Office

References

External links

 Tobu station information 
	

Tobu Kiryu Line
Stations of Tobu Railway
Railway stations in Gunma Prefecture
Railway stations in Japan opened in 1913
Ōta, Gunma